Novyi Rozdil is a city in Stryi Raion, Lviv Oblast (region) of Ukraine. Novyi Rozdil hosts the administration of Novyi Rozdil urban hromada, one of the hromadas of Ukraine. Population: .

Until 18 July 2020, Novyi Rozdil was incorporated as a city of oblast significance. In July 2020, as part of the administrative reform of Ukraine, which reduced the number of raions of Lviv Oblast to seven, the city of Novyi Rozdil was merged into Stryi Raion.

International relations

Twin towns — Sister cities
Novyi Rozdil is twinned with:
 Police, Poland

References

Cities in Lviv Oblast